Henry IV of Neuhaus (also known as Henry IV of Hradec; ; 13 April 1442 – 17 January 1507), was a member of the Telč branch of the noble von Neuhaus family.  He was High Treasurer of Bohemia from 1485 to 1503 and Highest Burgrave of the Prague Castle (1503-1507).

Life 
His parents were John of Neuhaus and Telč (1419–1451) and Catherine of Sternberg.  In 1453, Ulrich von Neuhaus, a son of Meinhard of Neuhaus, died without male offspring, and his possessions were inherited by Henry IV and his brother Hermann.  However, Hermann died young in 1464.

When Henry IV came of age in 1464, he became to sole ruler of the family possessions.  He managed to reduce the family debt and to round off his territory by acquiring twelve small manors, making him one of the largest land-owners in Bohemia and Moravia.  His possessions included Jindřichův Hradec, Telč, Počátky, Slavonice and many villages and towns in the associated Lordships.

Henry resided at Jindrichuv Hradec Castle.  He was one of the most influential members of the von Neuhaus family and attained high state offices.  From 1485 to 1503 he was High Treasurer of Bohemia; from 1503 to 1507, he was Burgrave of Prague Castle.  On 17 January 1507 he was killed while hunting.

Family 
Henry's first marriage was with Elizabeth of Sternberg; his second wife was Agnes of Cimburg (d. 1485).  His third marriage was with Magdalena of Gleichen, and after her death in 1492, he married Anna of Poděbrady, the daughter of Duke Henry the Younger Münsterberg-Oels.

From his fourth marriage, he had two children
 Adam I (d. 1531)
 Anna (d. 1570), who married
 firstly with Hynek Boček of Kunštát (d. 1518),
 secondly with Ladislav of Sternberg and Bechyně (d. 1521)
 thirdly with Henry VII of Rosenberg (d. 1526)

References 
 František Teplý: Dějiny města Jindřichova Hradce', part I, vol. 1, Jindřichův Hradec, 1927, (with genealogical tables to 1453)
 František Teplý: Dějiny města Jindřichova Hradce', part I, vol. 2, Jindřichův Hradec, 1927, (with genealogical tables from 1453)

Footnotes 

Medieval Bohemian nobility
1442 births
1507 deaths
15th-century Bohemian people